Michele Smith (born 11 June 1970) is a Caymanian former cyclist. He competed at the 1988 Summer Olympics and the 1992 Summer Olympics.

Major results

2012
 National Road Championships
1st Road race
2nd Time trial
2013
 1st Time trial, National Road Championships
2014
 National Road Championships
1st Time trial
3rd Road race
2015
 2nd Time trial, National Road Championships
2016
 2nd Time trial, National Road Championships

References

External links

1970 births
Living people
Caymanian male cyclists
Olympic cyclists of the Cayman Islands
Cyclists at the 1988 Summer Olympics
Cyclists at the 1992 Summer Olympics
Place of birth missing (living people)